Pieter Herman Omtzigt (born 8 January 1974) is an independent Dutch politician who has been a member of the House of Representatives since 2003 apart from a short interruption from 17 June to 26 October 2010. 

In his political work, Omtzigt focuses on matters of taxes and pensions. He rose to prominence for his role in uncovering the  childcare benefits scandal.

Political career

House of Representatives
In parliament, Omtzigt currently serves on the Committees on European Affairs, Foreign Affairs, Housing and Kingdom Services, Social Affairs and Employment, Finance and Public Expenditure. From 2017, he served as the parliament's rapporteur on Brexit.

From 2019, Omtzigt, together with Member of Parliament Renske Leijten (SP), stood up for affected parents in the childcare benefits scandal in which more than 20,000 families were wronged when applying for childcare allowance. In the end, civil servants and (former) ministers were heard by the parliamentary questioning committee on Childcare Allowance, which ultimately led to the fall of the third Rutte cabinet in January 2021.

In July 2020, Omtzigt was defeated by Deputy Prime Minister Hugo de Jonge in a vote for the position of leader of the Christian Democratic Appeal. Omtzigt was re-elected in the 2021 general election, winning 342,472 preference votes, more than any other non-party leader. Following the election, Omtzigt took time off, after complaining of exhaustion. Despite his leave, he decided to attend his installation on 31 March 2021.

On 25 March 2021, confidential notes from the government formation were revealed to include, among other things, "position Omtzigt, function elsewhere". This prompted a heated debate in parliament and an impasse in the government formation. Amid the continuous news, Omtzigt took a formal leave of absence of four months starting on 25 May. He was temporarily replaced as a member of parliament by Henri Bontenbal.

On 10 June 2021 a 78-page memo by Omtzigt was leaked, addressed to the CDA's Spies-committee that analysed the results of the parliamentary elections of March 2021. Omtzigt lashed out hard at the CDA, group employees and CDA members of parliament who were not named and wrote that he was promised the leadership of the party if Hugo de Jonge would withdraw as party leader. After De Jonge's departure, however, the party leadership was offered to Wopke Hoekstra. According to Omtzigt, that was completely beyond his control. According to Omtzigt, political party members and members of the House of Representatives have said about him that he is a "psychopath, sick man, rabid dog, jerk, disturbed" and "unstable". Some of those claims were added to the memo by Omtzigt in a WhatsApp screenshot. Two days later, Omtzigt announced that he had left the CDA, and that he would continue as an independent member of parliament after his leave of absence.

Parliamentary Assembly of the Council of Europe
In addition to his role in parliament, Omtzigt has been serving as member of the Dutch delegation to the Parliamentary Assembly of the Council of Europe (PACE) since 2004. He is currently a member of the Committee on Legal Affairs and Human Rights; the Committee on the Honouring of Obligations and Commitments by Member States of the Council of Europe (Monitoring Committee); the Sub-Committee on Human Rights; the Sub-Committee on the implementation of judgments of the European Court of Human Rights; and the Sub-Committee on the Rights of Minorities. 

In his capacity at the Parliamentary Assembly, Omtzigt has served as the Assembly's rapporteur on mass surveillance since 2014. He has also been the Parliamentary Assembly’s General Rapporteur on the protection of whistleblowers since 2021.

Omtzigt has also served as rapporteur on the case of the car bombing of journalist Daphne Caruana Galizia (2018), justice for the victims of ISIL (2019); and on Poland (2019). Between 2016 and 2017, he prepared the Assembly's proposal on an Investment Court System (ICS) for arbitrating in commercial disputes between states and foreign investors.

Political positions
Omtzigt was seen as representative of the CDA's eurosceptic wing. He has been critical of European Central Bank policies and, in 2020, pushed his party to support the idea of the Netherlands opting-out of unwanted EU programs.

Controversy
In 2017, media in the Netherlands described how fake news reports of Malaysia Airlines Flight 17 crash were propagated with the support of Omtzigt who introduced a Russian man as an "eyewitness" of the crash on a public expert debate in May 2017. The man, who was an asylum-seeker from Ukraine, never witnessed the crash, and his speech, texted to him by Omtzigt prior to the interview, repeated one of the Russia-promoted versions of Mig jets downing the Boeing. Shortly thereafter, journalists determined that R. had not been at home on the night of the crash and he had already been interviewed by officials who had discounted him as a witness. He acknowledged via Twitter that he had acted carelessly and a few days later resigned from the spokesperson for the MH17 file.

References

External links 

 Parlement.com biography 
 Pieter Omtzigt at the website of the House of Representatives
 Pieter Omtzigt (in Dutch) at the website of the Christian Democratic Appeal
 
 pieteromtzigt.nl (in Dutch) on his website presenting himself as independent politician.

1974 births
Living people
20th-century Dutch economists
21st-century Dutch economists
21st-century Dutch politicians
Alumni of the University of Exeter
Christian Democratic Appeal politicians
Dutch eurosceptics
Dutch statisticians
Econometricians
Independent politicians in the Netherlands
European University Institute alumni
Members of the House of Representatives (Netherlands)
People from Enschede
Politicians from The Hague
University of Amsterdam alumni